Teodoro Obiang Nguema Mbasogo (born 5 June 1942) is an Equatoguinean politician and former military officer who has served as the second president of Equatorial Guinea since August 1979. He is the longest-serving president of any country ever and the second-longest consecutively-serving current non-royal national leader in the world (after Paul Biya in Cameroon).

After graduating from military school, Obiang held numerous positions under the presidency of his uncle, Francisco Macías Nguema, including director of the notorious Black Beach prison. He ousted Macías in a 1979 military coup and took control of the country as president and chairman of the Supreme Military Council junta. After the country's nominal return to civilian rule in 1982, he founded the Democratic Party of Equatorial Guinea (PDGE) in 1987, which was the country's sole legal party until 1992. He has overseen Equatorial Guinea's emergence as an important oil producer, beginning in the 1990s. Obiang was Chairperson of the African Union from 2011 to 2012.

Obiang is regarded as an authoritarian leader. He has been widely accused of corruption and abuse of power. Under his rule, Equatorial Guinea continues to have one of the worst human rights records in the world. In marked contrast to the trend toward democracy in most of Africa, Equatorial Guinea is currently a dominant-party state, in which Obiang's PDGE holds virtually all governing power in the nation and has held all or almost all seats in the legislature since its creation. The constitution provides Obiang sweeping powers, including the right to rule by decree, effectively making his government a legal dictatorship. Obiang has placed family members in key government positions.

Early life

Early years

From a family of the Esangui ethnic clan, he was born in the town of Acoacán (Mongomo district, Wele-Nzas province), belonging to the colony of Spanish Guinea, on the current border with Gabon, within the Continental Equatorial Guinea. Son of the Gabonese Santiago Nguema Eneme Obama and María Mbasogo Ngui, Obiang was the third of ten brothers, among whom are also the National Security Delegate Armengol Ondo Nguema and former National Defense Minister Antonio Mba Nguema. Obiang's parents emigrated from Gabon to avoid paying capitation taxes and take advantage of the good economic situation in Spanish Guinea. After the death of María Mbasogo Ngui, Obiang and his brothers were raised by his father and his new wife Carmen Mikue Mbira.

Education and formation
Obiang completed his first studies at the Cardenal Cisneros School Group in Ebebiyin and at the La Salle Center in Bata (now the Enrique Nov Okenve National College), where he obtained a degree in labor administration.

Obiang joined the Colonial Guard during Equatorial Guinea's colonial period and attended the General Military Academy in Zaragoza, Spain. He achieved the rank of lieutenant after his uncle, Francisco Macías Nguema, was elected the country's first president. Under Macías, Obiang held various positions, including the governor of Bioko and leader of the National Guard. He was also head of Black Beach Prison, notorious for severely torturing its inmates.

Presidency

After Macías ordered the murders of several members of the family they shared, including Obiang's brother, Obiang and others in Macías's inner circle feared the president had become insane. Obiang overthrew his uncle on 3 August 1979 in a bloody coup d'état, and placed him on trial for his actions, including the genocide of the Bubi people, over the previous decade. Macías was sentenced to death and executed by firing squad on 29 September 1979. A new Moroccan presidential guard was required to form the firing squad, because local soldiers feared his alleged magical powers.

Obiang declared that the new government would make a fresh start from Macías's brutal and repressive régime. He granted amnesty to political prisoners, and ended the previous régime's system of forced labor. However, he made virtually no mention of his own role in the atrocities committed under his uncle's rule.

New constitution
The country nominally returned to civilian rule in 1982, with the enactment of a slightly less authoritarian constitution. At the same time, Obiang was elected to a seven-year term as president; he was the only candidate. He was reelected in 1989, again as the only candidate. After other parties were nominally allowed to organize in 1992, he was reelected in 1996 and 2002 with 98 percent of the vote in elections condemned as fraudulent by international observers. In 2002, for instance, at least one voting district was recorded as giving Obiang 103 percent of the vote.

He was reelected for a fourth term in 2009 with 97% of the vote, again amid accusations of voter fraud and intimidation, beating opposition leader Plácido Micó Abogo.

Obiang's rule was at first considered more humane than that of his uncle. By some accounts, however, it has become increasingly brutal, and has bucked the larger trend toward greater democracy in Africa. According to most domestic and international observers, he leads one of the most corrupt, ethnocentric and repressive regimes in the world. Equatorial Guinea is essentially a one-party state dominated by Obiang's Democratic Party of Equatorial Guinea (PDGE). The constitution grants Obiang sweeping powers, including the power to rule by decree.

Although opposition parties were legalized in 1992, the legislature remains dominated by the PDGE, and there is no substantive opposition to executive decisions. At present, every Senate seat and all but one seat in the Chamber of Deputies is held by the PDGE. There have never been more than eight opposition deputies in the lower house, while the PDGE has held every seat in the Senate since its inception in 2013. For all intents and purposes, Obiang holds all governing power in the nation.

The opposition is barely tolerated; indeed, a 2006 article in Der Spiegel quoted Obiang as asking, "What right does the opposition have to criticize the actions of a government?" The opposition is severely hampered by the lack of a free press as a vehicle for their views. There are no newspapers and all broadcast media are either owned outright by the government or controlled by its allies.

Relations with the United States

Equatorial Guinea's relations with the United States cooled in 1993, after Ambassador John E. Bennett was accused of practicing witchcraft at the graves of 10 British airmen who were killed when their plane crashed there during World War II. Bennett left after receiving a death threat at the U.S. Embassy in Malabo in 1994. In his farewell address, he publicly named the government's most notorious torturers, including Equatorial Guinea's Minister of National Security, Manuel Nguema Mba, another Obiang uncle. No new envoy was appointed, and the embassy was closed in 1996, leaving its affairs to be handled by the embassy in neighboring Cameroon.

Things turned around for the Obiang regime after the terrorist attacks in 2001 on New York and Washington, after which the United States re-prioritized its dealings with key African states. On 25 January 2002, the Institute for Advanced Strategic and Political Studies, a neoconservative Israeli-based think tank, sponsored a forum on 15 May 2006. Speaking at the IASPS forum, Assistant Secretary of State for Africa Walter H. Kansteiner said, "African oil is of national strategic interest to us, and it will increase and become more important as we move forward."

In a lengthy state visit from March to April 2006, President Obiang sought to reopen the closed embassy in the US, saying that "the lack of a U.S. diplomatic presence is definitely holding back economic growth." President Obiang was warmly greeted by Secretary of State Condoleezza Rice, who called him a "good friend". 
Public relations company Cassidy & Associates may have been partially responsible for the change in tone between Obiang and the United States government. Since 2004, Cassidy had been employed by the dictator's government at a rate of at least $120,000 a month.

By October 2006, however, the Senate Foreign Relations Committee had raised concerns about the proposal to build the new embassy on land owned by Obiang, whom the United Nations Commission on Human Rights accused of directly overseeing the torture of opponents. The new embassy chancery opened in 2013.

Controversy

In July 2003, state-operated radio declared Obiang "the country's god" with "all power over men and things." It added that the president was "in permanent contact with the Almighty" and "can decide to kill without anyone calling him to account and without going to hell." He personally made similar comments in 1993. Macías had also proclaimed himself a god.

Obiang has encouraged his cult of personality by ensuring that public speeches end in well-wishing for himself rather than for the nation as a whole. Many important buildings have a presidential lodge, many towns and cities have streets commemorating Obiang's coup against Macías, and many people wear clothes with his face printed on them.

Like his predecessor and other African strongmen such as Idi Amin and Mobutu Sese Seko, Obiang has assigned himself several creative titles. Among them are "gentleman of the great island of Bioko, Annobón and Río Muni." He also refers to himself as El Jefe (the boss).

In 2008, American journalist Peter Maass called Obiang Africa's worst dictator, worse than Robert Mugabe of Zimbabwe. While he was researching a book on the country's oil boom in 2004, Maass recalled that no one approached him on the streets. He believed that the only time he had encountered a more docile populace was in North Korea.

In an October 2012 interview on CNN, Christiane Amanpour asked Obiang whether he would step down at the end of his current term (2009–2016) since he had been reelected at least four times in his reign of over thirty years. In his response, Obiang categorically refused to step down despite term limits in the 2011 constitution.

Abuses

Abuses under Obiang have included "unlawful killings by security forces; government-sanctioned kidnappings; systematic torture of prisoners and detainees by security forces; life-threatening conditions in prisons and detention facilities; impunity; arbitrary arrest, detention, and incommunicado detention."

The few private media outlets in the country are largely owned by persons close to Obiang. Freedoms of association and of assembly are severely curtailed, and the government imposes restrictive conditions on the registration and operation of nongovernmental organizations. The few local activists who work on human rights-related issues often face intimidation, harassment, and reprisals.

Wealth

Forbes magazine has said that Obiang, with a net worth of US$600 million, is one of the world's wealthiest heads of state.

In 2003, Obiang told his citizenry that he felt compelled to take full control of the national treasury in order to prevent civil servants from being tempted to engage in corrupt practices. Obiang then deposited more than half a billion dollars into more than sixty accounts controlled by himself and his family at Riggs Bank in Washington, D.C., leading a U.S. federal court to fine the bank $16 million for allowing him to do so. A United States Senate investigation in 2004 found that the Washington-based Riggs Bank had
taken $300 million in payments on behalf of Obiang from Exxon Mobil and Hess Corporation.

In 2008, the country became a candidate for the Extractive Industries Transparency Initiative – an international project meant to promote openness about government oil revenues – but never qualified and missed the April 2010 deadline. Transparency International includes Equatorial Guinea on its list of twelve most corrupt states.

Beginning in 2007, Obiang and several other African state leaders came under investigation for corruption and fraudulent use of funds. He was suspected of using public funds to finance private mansions and other luxuries for both himself and his family. He and his son, in particular, owned several properties and supercars in France. Several complaints were also filed in US courts against Obiang's son. Attorneys stressed that the funds appropriated by the Obiangs were taken quite legally under Equatoguinean laws, even though those laws might not agree with international standards.

The U.S. Department of Justice alleged that Obiang and his son had appropriated hundreds of millions of dollars through corruption. In 2011 and early 2012, many assets were seized from Obiang and his son by the French and American governments, including mansions, wine collections, and supercars. The United States, France and Spain have all investigated the Obiang family's use of public funds. The corruption investigation is ongoing.

Obiang, his cabinet and his family allegedly have received billions in undisclosed oil revenue each year from the nation's oil production. Marathon Oil purchased land from Abayak, Obiang's personal investment vehicle, for more than $2 million; in June 2004 the sale was pending but Marathon had already made a $611,000 first payment with a check made out to Obiang. Marathon also was involved in a joint venture to operate two gas plants with GEOGAM, a quasi-state firm in which Abayak controlled a 75% stake.

Although the cabinet has made moderate increases in social spending, these remain far overshadowed by the spending on, for instance, presidential palaces. In addition, the Obiang administration has been characterized by harassment of dissenters and foreign officials seeking to report on conditions.

Obiang filed a libel lawsuit in a French court against an organization he believed was demeaning his image by saying that his government had committed such acts, but the case was dismissed.

Obiang has made several pledges to commit to open governance, reduce corruption, increase transparency, and improve the quality of life and uphold the basic freedoms of his citizens. Critics say that Obiang's government has made very little progress toward this goal, however. Several international groups have called for Obiang to:
 increase fiscal transparency and accountability by publishing all government revenues, and conducting and publishing annual audits of government accounts, including those abroad, and forcing officials to declare assets
 Disclose natural resource revenues
 Greatly increase spending alleviation of poverty
 Uphold political freedoms and rights
 Allow judicial practices to meet international standards
 Cease harassing and hindering his critics
 Allow foreign inspectors and groups to travel freely, unhindered and unharassed.

The U.S. Justice Department has alleged that Obiang's son also extorted funds from lumber and construction companies by inflating contractor payments by as much as 500%, then funnelled the funds into a private accounts for his own use. Obiang and his cabinet have defended Kiki, as his son is known. Lawyers uphold his innocence in both US and French courts, saying he received the funds legally though legitimate business enterprises.

Shortly after the emergence of these allegations, Obiang named his son Equatorial Guinea's deputy permanent delegate to UNESCO, possibly giving him diplomatic immunity from prosecution. Obiang has created an independent audit task force to review the expenditures and financials of public figures in the government, screen for corruption, and increase financial transparency. The head of this task force, however, was appointed by Obiang himself.

Finances

Obiang had a close relationship with the Washington DC-based Riggs Bank. He is said to have been welcomed by top Riggs officials, who held a luncheon in his honor. Publicity regarding this relationship would later contribute to the downfall of Riggs.

On 10 November 2010, the Supreme Court of France ruled that a complaint filed by Transparency International in France on 2 December 2008 was admissible to the court system there. The decision allowed the appointment of an investigating judge and a judicial inquiry into claims that Obiang used state funds to purchase private property in France.

A 2010 article published in Forbes magazine suggested that Obiang gathered roughly $700 million of the country's wealth in US bank accounts.

Personal life
Obiang reportedly favours his son Teodoro Nguema to succeed him.

Honours
: Grand Collar of the Order of Lakandula, Rank of Supremo (19 May 2006)
: Grand Officer Honorary Order of the Yellow Star

References

External links

 President Obiang's address to the 63rd session of the United Nations General Assembly, 25 September 2008
 Honorary Consul for Equatorial Guinea
 Who's Africa's Worst Dictator? Hint: It's probably not Robert Mugabe Slate.com
 "Torture and Poverty in Equatorial Guinea", Alexander Smoltczyk, Der Spiegel, 28 August 2006
 Amidst Poverty, Equatorial Guinea Builds Lavish City to Host African Union — video report by Democracy Now!

|-

1942 births
Living people
Democratic Party of Equatorial Guinea politicians
Equatoguinean Roman Catholics
Leaders who took power by coup
People from Wele-Nzas
Presidents of Equatorial Guinea
Finance ministers of Equatorial Guinea
Grand Cordons of the Honorary Order of the Yellow Star
Grand Collars of the Order of Lakandula